Bone Tomahawk is a 2015 American Western horror film written and directed by S. Craig Zahler in his directorial debut, and starring Kurt Russell, Patrick Wilson, Matthew Fox, Richard Jenkins, Lili Simmons, Evan Jonigkeit, David Arquette and Sid Haig. It was produced by Jack Heller and Dallas Sonnier. The film is about a small-town sheriff who leads a posse into a desolate region to rescue three people who were abducted by a cannibalistic Native American clan.

Development of the film started when Zahler's friend and manager Sonnier recommended to create a film adaptation of Zahler's Western novel Wraiths of a Broken Land. Realizing that such a project could not be adapted on a low budget, Zahler opted to write a rescue Western instead. Casting began in October 2014, with Peter Sarsgaard, Timothy Olyphant, and Jennifer Carpenter signed on to play before being replaced by Wilson, Fox, and Simmons respectively due to scheduling conflicts. Principal photography took place in California over a course of 21 days in October 2014.

The premiere of Bone Tomahawk took place at Fantastic Fest on October 1, 2015. RLJ Entertainment gave the film a limited release on October 23, grossing over $480,000 in theater sales and $4.32 million in home media sales against a $1.8 million budget. The film received mainly positive reviews, with praise for Zahler's screenplay and direction and the performances of the ensemble cast, though its runtime was criticized.

Plot
In the 1890s, brigands Purvis and Buddy encounter a Native American burial site. They are ambushed and Buddy is killed while Purvis escapes. Purvis reaches the nearby town of Bright Hope and buries his loot; seeing this, Deputy Chicory reports him to Sheriff Franklin Hunt, who shoots Purvis in the leg when he attempts to escape. Hunt sends the confident gunslinger John Brooder to fetch the town's doctor, but ends up fetching Samantha O'Dwyer, the doctor's daughter and assistant, who is caring for her injured husband Arthur. Hunt leaves Samantha in the sheriff's office with his other deputy, Nick, to tend to Purvis' wounds. That night, a nearby stable boy is killed.

Hunt learns of the murder and goes to his office finding it empty, with an arrow left behind. The Professor, an educated Native American, links the arrow to a tribe that he refers to as "Troglodytes" and locates the valley they inhabit on a map, warning Hunt that they are a group of inbred cannibals shunned and avoided by other native tribes. Certain that Samantha, Nick, and Purvis have been captured by them, Hunt forms a rescue party with Chicory and Brooder. Arthur insists on accompanying them to find his wife, despite his injury.

Days into their ride, two strangers stumble across the rescue party's camp and are killed by Brooder, who fears they are scouts for a raid. The rescue party set up a new camp, but are ambushed by raiders who injure Brooder's horse and steal the rest. The following day, a fight breaks out between Brooder and Arthur, exacerbating Arthur's leg wound. Chicory leaves him to recover while he, Hunt, and Brooder continue on foot. Reaching the valley, the rescue party are ambushed by the Troglodytes. The rescuers kill three, but Brooder is killed and Hunt and Chicory are captured and imprisoned.

Hunt and Chicory find Samantha and Nick in a different cell and learn the Troglodytes have already killed and eaten Purvis. The group later witness Nick stripped, brutally scalped, bisected alive, and then consumed. Hunt tricks several Troglodytes into drinking liquor laced with opium tincture, with one dying while another becomes unconscious. Arthur follows the men's trail and discovers the valley. He kills two Troglodytes and discovers they use an animal bone in their windpipes as a whistle. He blows on it, luring another Troglodyte, then kills him.

In the cave, the Troglodyte leader grows angry at the poisoning. The Troglodytes cut open Hunt's abdomen, shove the heated opium flask into the wound, and shoot him. Arthur arrives, killing the leader, and frees Samantha and Chicory. A mortally wounded Hunt stays behind with a rifle, promising to kill any surviving Troglodytes when they return, to prevent them from terrorizing Bright Hope. As the three leave the cave, they see two pregnant Troglodyte women, who have had all their limbs amputated and stakes driven into their eyes to blind them. After the party is at a distance from the valley, Arthur blows on the Troglodyte whistle, with no response. They then hear three gunshots.

Cast

Production

Development
Bone Tomahawk is the directorial debut of screenwriter and novelist S. Craig Zahler, who wrote the script in 2011. Zahler had previously completed more than forty original screenplays for Hollywood, including The Brigands of Rattleborge, which topped The Black List in 2006. However, only one film was produced: the 2011 low-budget horror film Asylum Blackout.

Zahler had previously written four Westerns, making Bone Tomahawk his fifth work in the Western genre. Back in 2005, Zahler watched nineteen films in two weeks at a Westerns festival at the Film Forum. On seeing a film he didn't like, he began to think about how he would improve it, and decided to write novels and screenplays in the Western genre. The concept of Bone Tomahawk arose when Zahler's manager, producer and friend Dallas Sonnier proposed he make a film adaption of his novel Wraiths of the Broken Land, directed by Zahler himself. However, Zahler believed the novel could not be adapted on a low budget and opted to write a rescue Western, Bone Tomahawk, instead. Bone Tomahawk was described by Alex Godfrey of The Guardian as "a western with horror trimmings," but has been described by Zahler as just a direct Western, with references to lost race fiction such as H. Rider Haggard's King Solomon's Mines. Zahler incorporated some details of his personal life into the script, such as when Brooder says, "Smart men don’t get married", to reflect his own disinterest in marriage. Zahler includes humor in every work he writes, stating: "It’s one of these things where you’re dealing with a serious situation, but if everyone is frowning and dour all the time, and you don’t see life or love in these characters, I don’t know why you care."

When selling the movie to investors, Zahler used directors such as John Cassavetes, Larry Clark, Wong Kar-wai, and Takeshi Kitano as stylistic reference points, despite none being filmmakers in the Western genre. Despite Sonnier's assurances that there will be no intervention in the script, investors still wanted the script to be changed due to conflicting interpretations of the film’s genre, and the film being Zahler’s directorial debut. Zahler refused to compromise on full creative control and reducing the film length to ninety minutes. Zahler and Sonnier finally accumulated a $1.8 million budget, half provided by Sonnier and the other half provided by British company The Fyzz Facility. Due to budget constraints, a substantial amount of content in the script did not make it into the final film. Production of the film was made public on October 30, 2012 and was funded by Caliber Media Company, owned by Sonnier and Jack Heller, with French company Celluloid Dreams handling international sales.

Casting

Kurt Russell's agent handed over the script to Peter Sarsgaard, who enjoyed the script and signed on to the movie, leading to him passing the script off to Russell. Zahler thought that Russell was a good fit for the role of Sheriff Franklin Hunt, who read the script and quickly agreed to perform. Russell got along well with Zahler, and had also read Zahler's novel Wraiths of the Broken Land. In his interview with Collider, Russell appreciated Zahler's script and his "sparse" writing style, stating that Bone Tomahawk is a graphic Western rather than a straight Western or a horror Western.

On October 31, 2012, Russell, Sarsgaard, Richard Jenkins and Jennifer Carpenter signed on to play a sheriff, a cowboy, an oldster, and one of the captives of troglodyte cannibals, respectively. On September 24, 2014, Patrick Wilson and Matthew Fox joined the cast of the film to star along with Russell and Jenkins. On September 29, Lili Simmons, David Arquette, Sid Haig, Kathryn Morris and Evan Jonigkeit joined the film with Simmons replacing Carpenter. The other ensemble cast added by the director includes Sean Young, Geno Segers, Fred Melamed, James Tolkan, Raw Leiba, Jamie Hector, Jamison Newlander, Michael Paré, Zahn McClarnon, David Midthunder, Jay Tavare, Gray Wolf Herrera, Robert Allen Mukes, and Brandon Molale. In addition, both Sarsgaard and Timothy Olyphant, who were originally scheduled to star in the film, withdrew.

Russell praised Zahler's skills as a director, especially since Bone Tomahawk is his directorial debut. Russell described Sheriff Franklin Hunt as a stubborn and simple good man, whose behavior and tone were very in line with the era in the film. In his comparisons of Hunt to Wyatt Earp, he thought that Hunt and Earp will respect each other, but Earp will be uninterested in him due to Hunt being a low-profile person. In addition, since Russell was also involved in The Hateful Eight at about the same time, he had to look different between the two films in regards to the style of hair and beard, remarking: "I had to cheat it. So the look I have in Bone Tomahawk was sort of a halfway house thing, halfway to where I was going for Hateful Eight. It's in full blown maturity in Hateful Eight!" Jenkins was Zahler's primary choice for the role of Deputy Chicory, who ended up becoming Zahler's favorite character to write. Although Chicory was written with Jenkins' voice in mind, Jenkins decided to give Chicory an accent and a raspy voice, and though he ended up in acting in a normal voice, he still pushed the accent on-screen.

Filming

Principal photography occurred over 21 days at the Paramount Ranch in California. Previously, the crew scouted filming locations at New Mexico, Utah, and Romania. Before filming began, experts told Zahler that shooting could take sixty days and cost $10 million, so Zahler kept a close eye on the schedule while filming and relying on staff to get the job done in a short amount of time. The actors performed their roles in the shortest amount of time possible, with one of the scenes using two takes; Russell also gave advice on shooting the violent scenes of the film. During filming, there were multiple firearms malfunctioning, as well as problems regarding special effects, makeup, personnel, and positioning. In order to shoot scenes with multiple characters on-screen, Bone Tomahawk was shot with a RED Dragon camera at a ratio of 2.35:1. In October 2017, Zahler reflected that he did not like that camera due to it being visually noisy, which led him to switch to the RED Weapon camera in his next film Brawl in Cell Block 99. Zahler avoids using too many close-ups in the film, remarking that "most of the time you interact with people, you’re not looking just their faces from a close distance unless you’re intimate." He believes that modern filmmaking's use of close-ups misses a lot of body language, especially the hands.

Bone Tomahawk is well-known for its violent scenes in the troglodytes' cave, with the most notable being Hunt and Chicory watching Nick get torn in half by the cannibals. The troglodytes' cave was shot in California and was a setting in the TV series Weeds and the movie Iron Man (2008). Zahler shows a dry presentation of violence in his films, using long shots to capture horrific violent acts on people, similar to Cannibal Holocaust (1980). Zahler explained that violence enhances the characters, stating: "By showing all that violence and showing him talking the guy through it—for me it was always a real scene of strength for Sheriff Hunt, to not just cower away or start blubbering—he’s talking a person through the worst moment of his life. As hideous as the violence is in that scene, it’s a real showing of character strength for Sheriff Hunt. He endures that and does something during those actions that most people couldn’t do." Zahler did not fully focus the camera on the troglodytes, wanting to make their culture more mysterious.

Music 

The film's soundtrack was composed by Zahler's friend Jeff Herriott. Herriott made the music accompany "long shots, rather than close-ups" and function as mood-setting or establish scenes and make transitions when there was no dialogue. Lakeshore Records released the soundtrack in Digital on October 23, 2015 and in Vinyl formats.

Release
In August 2015, RLJ Entertainment acquired distribution rights to the film, which had its world premiere at the Fantastic Fest on October 1, 2015. It later screened at the Charlotte Film Festival on October 3, 2015 and later at the London Film Festival on October 10, 2015. The first trailer of Bone Tomahawk was released on October 2, 2015. On October 23, 2015, Bone Tomahawk was given a limited release in the United States, and later was released on Blu-ray and DVD on December 29, 2015. Bone Tomahawk was released in a few theaters in the United States, grossing $475,846, plus a total of $4.28 million in home media sales.

The Blu-ray disc includes behind-the-scenes production footage, theatrical trailers, a collection of posters, a Q&A session with the director and cast and a deleted scene lasting for about two and a half minutes. The deleted scene is an extended version of the ending: Arthur, Chicory, and Samantha spend the night by a campfire, with Chicory naming Arthur as the new sheriff of Bright Hope before Arthur tries to read a "poem" to Samantha he wrote while he was working as a foreman.

Reception

Critical response

Bone Tomahawk received positive responses from critics and at festivals for its acting (particularly for Kurt Russell, Richard Jenkins and Matthew Fox), grittiness, Zahler's direction, and dialogue, which is stated to be a combination of The Searchers and various cannibal films. Film review aggregator Rotten Tomatoes reports that 91% of critics gave the film a "Certified Fresh" rating, based on 93 reviews with an average score of 7.2/10, with a consensus of: "Bone Tomahawk peculiar genre blend won't be for everyone, but its gripping performances and a slow-burning story should satisfy those in search of something different." Metacritic gave the film a weighted average score of 72 out of 100, based on 17 reviews from mainstream critics, considered to be "generally favorable."

Praise was given to the story and script, of which Peter Bradshaw of The Guardian enjoyed the mix of horror and Western genres, a sentiment that Kim Newman of Empire agrees to. Other reviewers such as Jeannette Catsoulis of The New York Times and Tom Huddleston of Time Out London enjoyed the comedy that was intertwined within the horror and Western elements of the film. Catsoulis stated that the "absymal racial politics" in the film is authentic to the time period. Reviewers such as Jeremy Aspinall from Radio Times called Bone Tomahawk for being a refreshing entry to the Western genre. Guy Lodge of Variety praised the film as "the wayward digressions of Zahler's script — navigated with palpable enjoyment by an expert, Kurt Russell-led ensemble — that are most treasurable in a film that commits wholeheartedly to its own curiosity value." John DeFore from The Hollywood Reporter offered the film similar praise, commending the film's performances, production design, cinematography, score, and screenplay, with the sentiment shared by Huddleston, Brian Tallerico of RogerEbert.com, and Don Kaye of Den of Geek.

Criticism was directed towards the film's runtime. Conversely, Oliver Lyttelton of IndieWire found Zahler's writing to be engaging and unhurried, and the length to be not an issue. Other criticisms included Kevin Maher of The Times believing that the violence in the film was a copycat of Quentin Tarantino's use of brutality in his films while Piers Marchant of the Arkansas Democrat-Gazette called the film racist, calling it "the equivalent of having as villains a sect of Orthodox Jews."

Accolades

References

External links
 

2015 films
2015 directorial debut films
2010s Western (genre) horror films
American Western (genre) horror films
American splatter films
2010s English-language films
Films about Native Americans
Films about cannibalism
Films directed by S. Craig Zahler
Films set in the 1890s
Films shot in California
2010s American films